Smoothened agonist (SAG) was one of the first small-molecule agonists developed for the protein Smoothened, a key part of the hedgehog signaling pathway, which is involved in brain development as well as having a number of other functions in the body.

Smoothened agonist has been shown to aid proliferation and survival of developing neurons, and prevent drug-induced brain injury. When injected into the cerebellum of newborn mice with an induced Down syndrome-like condition, Smoothened agonist was able to stimulate normal cerebellum development, resulting in significant behavioural improvement once the mice had grown to adulthood.

Smoothened Agonist was capable of inducing androgen production in both prostate and bone stromal cells that was significantly greater than even similarly treated prostate cancer cells.

Some analogues of piperazines as a novel class of Smoothened agonists modulates Hedgehog signaling in the crypts of the small intestines by binding to Smoothened and thereby leading to  intestinal stem cell compartment expansion, improved intestinal recovery, and survival of lethally irradiated animals.

References

Receptor agonists
Down syndrome